Marcial Ayaipoma Alvarado (born 8 February 1942) is a Peruvian doctor, surgerian and politician. As a member of Possible Peru, he was elected in 2000 as a Congressman and re-elected 2001. From 26 July 2005 to 26 July 2006 he was the President of the Congress of Peru. He announced that he was no longer participating in politics.

Dr. Ayaipoma is  well known in Peru as a prominent fan of tauromachy or bullfighting. He is a cattle man that breeds fighting bulls (Toros de lidia, in Spanish) for the ring. It is reported that he still has some livestock, called "La Huaca" in the Dos de Mayo province highlands, where he also is involved in operating a hostel named in honor to his mother, Abilia Alvarado.

References

Living people
Presidents of the Congress of the Republic of Peru
Possible Peru politicians

Members of the Congress of the Republic of Peru
Peruvian politicians
1942 births
People from Lima